Cathepsin L may refer to:

 Cathepsin L1, a human protease enzyme encoded by the CTSL gene and known for its role in viral entry
 Cathepsin L2, a human protease enzyme encoded by the CTSV gene and also known as cathepsin V